Eucocytia is a genus of moths of the family Noctuidae.  It is the only genus in subfamily Eucocytiinae.

Selected species
Eucocytia meeki Rothschild & Jordan, 1905

References
Natural History Museum Lepidoptera genus database

Noctuidae